Lorraine Hyde (born 11 December 1989) is a Scottish female professional darts player who currently plays in the World Darts Federation (WDF) and Professional Darts Corporation (PDC) events. Her biggest achievement to date was won the British Classic. She took part in the WDF World Cup and WDF Europe Cup for several times, and also participated in the WDF World Darts Championship.

Career
Hyde started playing darts in 2004, at the age of 15. She was very promising player. Within a few years, she took high places in international youth tournaments, within reached the finals in the 2007 Winmau World Masters for girls. In the final match she played against Kimberley Lewis who defending title from the previous year. Ultimately, she lost with a score of 2–4 in legs. In October 2022, she was selected by the national federation to participate in the 2007 WDF World Cup in youth's competitions. In the singles competition, she was advanced to the semi-finals, where she lost to eventual winner Linda Odén by 1–3 in legs.

As Mark Webster's girlfriend at this time, she also sat in the audience at the major events several times, before making her debut as player in the 2008 Winmau World Masters. She lost in the first round against Amanda Harwood by 1–4 in legs. Also in the 2009 Winmau World Masters she lost in the first round match, this time against Carole Frison by 2–4 in legs. Hyde was also at the start for the next two editions, but she was not able to win a match here either. Until 2016, she did not appear in the international competition. During the Welsh Open in 2016, he reached a Last 16 phase. Hyde also finished in the Last 16 phase at the BDO International Open. She eventually returned to play for the 2016 Winmau World Masters but lost again in the first round match. This time her opponent was Vicky Pruim, with whom she lost by 2–4 in legs.

During the 2018 WDF Europe Cup, she was part of the Scotland team that won the bronze medal in the team competition. Hyde's performance increased from 2021 with a victory at the British Classic. On the way to the final, she defeated Jo Rolls, Anca Zijlstra, Kirsty Hutchinson and Anastasia Dobromyslova. In the final match, she beat Denise Cassidy by 5–1 in legs. Since 2020 she also participate in the Professional Darts Corporation (PDC) tournaments. In 2021, she made it to the semi-finals of the Women's Series and finished in the top 20 of that ranking. In the same year, she reached a quarter-finals at the Irish Open and Irish Classic. Her next tournament was the Italian Grand Masters, where she lost to Priscilla Steenbergen. She played another good games at the Isle of Man Open, where she lost the semi-finals match against Deta Hedman by 2–4 in legs.

After a very good season, she qualified for the 2022 WDF World Darts Championship. In her debut at this stage, she played against Tori Kewish and lost by 0–2 in sets. She played at the 2022 Dutch Open and was advanced to the fifth round, where she lost to Lorraine Winstanley by 3–4 in legs. At the end of September 2022, she was selected by the national federation to participate in the 2022 WDF Europe Cup. On the second day of the tournament, she advanced to the fourth round of the singles competition, where she lost to Claire Brookin by 0–4 in legs. On the third day, she lost very quick in the pairs competition. In the team tournament, she was eliminated in the quarter-finals.

World Championship results

WDF
 2022: First round (lost to Tori Kewish 0–2)
 2023:

Performance timeline

References

Living people
1989 births
British Darts Organisation players
Scottish darts players
Professional Darts Corporation women's players